Kai Cenat III (born December 16, 2001) is an American live streamer and YouTuber, best known for his live streams on Twitch and his comedy-based content posted on YouTube. 

On February 28, 2023, during a month-long subathon, he became the most-subscribed Twitch streamer of all time, beating the previous record set by fellow streamer Ludwig. He was named "Streamer of the Year" at the 12th Streamy Awards and the 2023 Steamer Awards.

Early life 
Kai Cenat  was born on December 16, 2001 in New York City. He was raised in The Bronx borough by a Haitian father and Trinidadian mother. Kai has three other siblings, a younger brother named Kaleel, an older brother named Devonte, and a twin sister named Kaia.

Originally aspiring to be a comedian, Cenat posted short-form content on Facebook and Instagram during middle and high school.

Cenat attended Frederick Douglass Academy for his secondary education. He graduated high school in 2019 and then attended Morrisville State College in August 27, 2019, to study Business Administration. He eventually dropped out of college in 2020 due to the struggle of keeping up with schoolwork and content creation.

Career 
Cenat uploaded his first YouTube video in January 13, 2018, and began making videos surrounding pranks and challenges. He joined the YouTube group AMP (Any Means Possible) after being discovered by fellow Bronx-born YouTuber Fanum. He regularly appeared in the channel's videos from then on. He began streaming on Twitch in February 2021 after migrating from YouTube, broadcasting gaming and reaction content. 

He had an acting role in the trailer for Polo G's June 2022 single "Distraction". On May 8, 2022, Cenat released his debut single "Bustdown Rollie Avalanche" with NLE Choppa.  

In 2022, Cenat began including celebrity guests on his streams, including Bobby Shmurda in April, Lil Baby in October, and 21 Savage in November, who helped him receive his highest viewership at the time with 283,245 concurrent viewers at its peak.

In October 2022, he was nominated for the 12th Streamy Awards in the "Streamer of the Year" and "Breakout Streamer" categories, winning the former in December. In November 2022, he had a guest appearance in Lil Uzi Vert's music video for "Just Wanna Rock".

On January 31, 2023, Cenat began a month-long subathon. On February 28, 2023, he became the most-subscribed Twitch streamer of all time, reaching 306,621 subscribers at its peak. On March 11, 2023, Cenat won "Streamer of the Year" at the 2nd Streamer Awards. On March 15, 2023, a documentary summarizing his career and subathon, titled 30 Days, was released on YouTube.

Awards and nominations

Discography

Singles

Filmography

Music video

Notes

References

External links 
 

Living people
2001 births
2012 establishments in the United States
21st-century American people
American YouTubers
English-language YouTube channels
Gaming-related YouTube channels
Gaming YouTubers
YouTube channels launched in 2012
American video bloggers
Twitch (service) streamers
Streamy Award winners